Naspers Limited is a South African multinational internet, technology and multimedia holding company headquartered in Cape Town, with interests in online retail, publishing and venture capital investment. Naspers' principal shareholder is its Dutch listed investment subsidiary Prosus, which owns approximately 49% of its parent as part of a cross ownership structure.

Founded in 1915 by attorney W. A. Hofmeyr, Naspers was the largest publishing company in South Africa throughout the 20th century with interests across newspapers, magazines and books. In the 1980s, the company began to diversify, launching a subscription television service and investing in markets outside of South Africa for the first time.

In 2001, Naspers made an early investment in Chinese technology firm Tencent and became increasingly focused on the global consumer internet sector. In 2019, Naspers listed its global internet investment business unit Prosus (including a 31% stake in Tencent) on Euronext Amsterdam.

Naspers currently owns a 56.92% stake in Prosus and wholly owns Media24 (Africa's largest publishing company), Takealot.com (South Africa's largest online retailer) and Naspers Foundry, a South African focused venture capital fund.

History

Founding and Afrikaner nationalism
In 1914, a group of prominent Cape Afrikaners decided at a meeting in Stellenbosch to form a publishing company that would support Afrikaner nationalism in the Union of South Africa. This meeting lead to W. A. Hofmeyr, a well-known Cape lawyer and National Party organizer; founding De Nasionale Pers Beperkt (National Press Ltd) in 1915 as a publisher of newspapers and magazines. The firm's name was commonly shortened to Naspers (De Nasionale Pers Beperk), the contraction eventually becoming used even by the company itself.

Naspers launched with the support of Jannie Marais, a prominent Stellenbosch farmer, Jan Christiaan Smuts, Louis Botha, and National Party founding president J.B.M. Hertzog. Naspers was strongly supportive of the National Party and began publishing the Afrikaans-language daily De Burger (later renamed Die Burger) in June 1915, followed by its first magazine, De Huisgenoot (later Die Huisgenoot) in 1916.

Domestic expansion (1917–1986)
In 1917, Naspers bought the weekly Bloemfontein-based Afrikaan newspaper Het Volksblad (now Volksblad), the first expansion beyond the Cape Province for the company. In 1925, Die Volksblad started publishing daily. In 1937, it started Die Oosterlig in the Eastern Cape. Also in 1937, Nasionale Pers set up the company Voortrekkerpers in the Transvaal to support the National Party in Transvaal by publishing Die Transvaler. Initially the Cape National Party tried to control the extremism of the National Party in the Transvaal by appointing Hendrik Verwoerd as the paper's first editor but he would side with Transvaal branch and Nationale Pers gave up editorial control in 1939. In order to combat the influence of Albert Hertzog in the Transvaal National Party, Nationale Pers introduced a more enlightened Sunday newspaper in 1965 in the province called the Die Beeld in competition to the Dagbreek. By 1970, these two papers, the latter owned by Perskor, to merge into a paper called the Rapport managed by both groups. In 1965, Naspers launched their first English-language magazine Fairlady. In 1974, the Afrikaans newspaper Beeld began publishing daily for the Johannesburg market.

Naspers entered the South African general and educational book publishing markets in 1918, initially publishing exclusively in Afrikaans. The company expanded to English-language titles in 1919 and Xhosa in 1922. Naspers spun off its book publishing operations in 1950 into a separate business, Nasionale Boekhandel. In 1963, Naspers recommenced educational publishing operations through subsidiary Nasou.

In 1973, Naspers took back control of Nasionale Boekhandel, before acquiring another publishing house Human & Rousseau in 1977. Naspers continued to develop its book publishing business during the 1980s, forming the Afrikaans-language book club Leserskring in 1979 and the English-language book club Leisure Hour. In 1986, Naspers acquired publisher JL van Schaik.

In 1984, Naspers acquired Drum Publications, publisher of the Sunday newspaper City Press and weekly magazines Drum and True Love & Family, titles focused on a black readership.

Diversification, IPO and international expansion (1986–2003)
In 1986, Naspers formed a partnership with other South African publishing companies and launched pay-TV service M-Net. M-Net proved successful and, with sister companies MultiChoice and M-Web, steadily expanded its operations both in South Africa and internationally throughout the 1990s.

In 1994, Naspers became publicly listed on the Johannesburg Stock Exchange in South Africa. The company also obtained a Level I American Depository Receipt listing on the London Stock Exchange. In 1998, the company formally changed its name to Naspers Limited.

Naspers became increasingly focused on digital businesses; launching South African web portal Media24 and online retailer Kalahari.com in 1998 and Chinese-focused web portal SportCN in 2000. In May 2001, Naspers purchased 46.5 percent of Chinese internet company Tencent, owner of WeChat, and an array of fintech apps and mobile games, from early investors including PCCW (the owner of Now TV) and IDG Capital. The investment has been referred to as one of the most successful venture capital deals of all time. making Naspers the most valuable publicly traded business in Africa by 2017.

In 2003, Naspers took full ownership of subscription television business M-Net and its sister companies MultiChoice and M-Web, integrating their extensive operations across Europe, Africa, Asia and the Middle East. Naspers also launched new publishing ventures in Nigeria and Hungary in 2003.

Online ventures (2003–2015)
With the success of the investment in Tencent, Naspers became an investor in a number of consumer internet startups. In January 2007 Naspers purchased a 30% share of Russia's largest internet company VK (company) (formerly Mail.ru Group) for $165 million.

Naspers had a particular focus on India, investing more than $4 billion from 2014 to 2019, across multiple sectors, including into Byju and ibibo. In December 2018, Naspers invested $1 billion into Indian online food ordering and delivery service Swiggy, the largest single investment made, outside of China, into a food tech company.

Consolidation (2015–present)
In 2015, Naspers merged its South African–focused Kalahari.com online retail business with market leader Takealot.com, acquiring a 46% stake in the merged company and creating South Africa's largest online retailer. By 2018, Naspers owned 96% of Takealot.com.

In December 2016, Naspers announced that it had entered into an agreement to sell telecommunications company M-Web to Internet Solutions (a subsidiary of Japanese telecommunications conglomerate Nippon Telegraph and Telephone), pending approval by the South African competition authorities. On 9 May 2017, it was announced that the South African competition authorities approved the proposed sale of M-Web, with 31 May 2017 being the effective commencement date.

In March 2018 Naspers sold part of its stake in Tencent, raising some $10 billion to fund other investments. At the time, its initial investment of $32 million in Tencent was valued at over $175 billion.

Naspers' video entertainment business was spun off as MultiChoice Group, on 27 February 2019, represented as MCG on the Johannesburg Stock Exchange. Shares in Multichoice Group were unbundled to Naspers shareholders, with Naspers retaining no stake in the newly listed company.

In 2019 Naspers listed its global internet investment business on Euronext Amsterdam as Prosus, which became Europe's largest consumer Internet company on its market debut. Share values gained over 25 percent on the day of its IPO, with Prosus' market capitalisation exceeding 125 billion pounds (US$138 billion). Prosus reported profits of $4.2 billion for its fiscal year ending 31 March 2019.

Naspers Labs, designed in partnership with RLabs and its founder Marlon Parker, launched in 2019 as an economic initiative for unemployed youth in South Africa.

In May 2021 Naspers announced a share swap deal with its Dutch-listed subsidiary Prosus in an attempt to reduce the discount between the asset value of the companies and their market capitalisation. The deal, successfully completed in August 2021, reduced Naspers' stake in Prosus to 56.92% and gave Prosus an approximately 49% share in its parent company.

Following the 2022 Russian invasion of Ukraine Naspers (through its subsidiary Prosus) wrote off its 27.29% investment, previously valued at US$769 million, in the Russian internet company VK.

Controversies

Apartheid
Documents collected by OpenSecrets revealed how Naspers funded the National Party (NP) during apartheid, and that the NP also held 74,000 shares in Naspers in 1984.

In a letter written to F.W. de Klerk, on 17 August 1989, Naspers' then managing director Ton Vosloo reaffirmed the company's support of the National Party. Vosloo reminded de Klerk of its donation of R150,000 (approximately R1-million today), made to the NP before the 1987 elections.  The company had then also pledged a further R220,000 in support of the NP ahead of South Africa's last race-based general elections, in September 1989. Vosloo ended his letter, promising funding to the NP in Transvaal, by adding that "our newspaper Beeld in the Transvaal is your ally and we trust that this formidable combination will wipe out the competition."

In 1997, the Truth and Reconciliation Commission requested that Naspers make a submission about the years between 1960 and 1994 (thus, broadly, between the Sharpeville massacre, in March 1960, and the first democratic elections of April 1994), specifically, the media's role during this period. Naspers refused to comply, which led to 127 Naspers employees each making an individual submission to the TRC, apologising for their role in the apartheid years. They said Naspers newspapers had formed an integral part of the power structure which implemented and maintained apartheid through, for instance, supporting the NP in elections and referendums.

In 2015, Media24 CEO Esmare Weideman issued a case-limited apology cited a single employee Conrad Sidego, who had experienced problems with separate facilities. She did not issue an unqualified apology for Naspers's role in supporting apartheid.

Assets
Naspers has two principal business units; Prosus & Naspers South Africa.

Prosus 
Prosus is the largest consumer internet company in Europe, and among the largest technology investors in the world, operating across a variety of platforms and geographies. As part of a share swap deal announced in May 2021, Prosus acquired a 49% stake in its parent company Naspers. Other major holdings of Prosus include:
 E-commerce – including OLX (100%) 
 Fintech – including PayU (98.8%)
 Food delivery – including iFood (54.8%), Delivery Hero (22.3%) and Swiggy (38.8%)
 Retail – including eMag (80.1%)
 Travel – including its associate, Ctrip (6%)
 Mobility – Bykea
 EdTech – Codecademy, Stack Overflow, Brainly, Udemy

Prosus is also the largest shareholder of social Internet platforms:

 Tencent (30.86%)
 VK (27.29%) – this investment was written off in March 2022.

Naspers South Africa
Naspers South Africa operates three media, e-commerce & venture capital businesses in South Africa:

Media24
Naspers wholly owns Media24, Africa's largest publisher, printer, and distributor of magazines and related products, as well its largest newspaper publisher.

Takealot.com
Naspers wholly owns Takealot.com, South Africa's largest online retailer.

Naspers Foundry
Naspers Foundry is a South Africa-focused early stage venture capital fund that invests in firms that "address big societal needs".

See also 
 List of South African mass media

References

External links
 
 

1915 establishments in South Africa
1994 initial public offerings
Publicly traded companies
Companies based in Cape Town
Companies listed on the Johannesburg Stock Exchange
Tencent
South African brands
Book publishing companies of South Africa
Magazine publishing companies of South Africa
Newspaper companies
Mass media in Cape Town
Television in South Africa
Internet technology companies